Oberes Geratal is a former Verwaltungsgemeinschaft ("collective municipality") in the district Ilm-Kreis, in Thuringia, Germany. The seat of the Verwaltungsgemeinschaft was in Gräfenroda. It was disbanded in January 2019.

The Verwaltungsgemeinschaft Oberes Geratal consisted of the following municipalities:

Frankenhain 
Gehlberg 
Geschwenda 
Gossel 
Gräfenroda
Liebenstein 
Plaue

References

Former Verwaltungsgemeinschaften in Thuringia